Emperor Duanzong of Song (10 July 1269 – 8 May 1278), personal name Zhao Shi, was the 17th emperor of the Song dynasty of China and the eighth and penultimate emperor of the Southern Song dynasty. He was the fifth son of Emperor Duzong and an elder brother of his predecessor, Emperor Gong and successor Zhao Bing.

Emperor Gong along with Grand Dowager Xie surrendered to the Yuan dynasty in 1276 after the fall of the Southern Song capital, Lin'an (present-day Hangzhou). Zhao Shi and his seventh brother, Zhao Bing, managed to escape southward to Fujian Province, where the new Song capital was established. On June 14, 1276, Zhao Shi was enthroned as the new Emperor Duanzong who ruled under the era name "Jingyan" (景炎; literally: "bright flame"). However, in early 1278, Yuan forces broke through the Song dynasty's last lines of defence, forcing Zhao Shi to flee again. Accompanied by loyal ministers such as Lu Xiufu and Zhang Shijie, Zhao Shi boarded a ship and fled further south to Guangdong Province. In March 1278, while fleeing from Yuan forces led by Liu Shen, in a hurricane, Zhao Shi fell from a boat and almost drowned. Thereafter, he stayed temporarily in Hong Kong which at that time was a small fishing village. He died a few months later in Gangzhou (碙州; present-day Jiangmen) due to Illness. He was succeeded by his seventh brother, Zhao Bing, who was enthroned in Mui Wo, the same village where Zhao Shi nearly drowned and died.
The body of Zhao Shi is buried in Sung Wing Fuk Ling (宋永福陵). The actual area of the tomb is still unknown and undiscovered. 

The historical relic Sung Wong Toi in present-day Hong Kong's Kowloon City commemorates Zhao Shi's escape to Hong Kong.

Family
Brothers:
 Emperor Gong of Song (personal name Zhao Xian) – Younger brother and predecessor of Emperor Duanzong; Sixth Son of Zhao Qi
 Emperor Bing of Song (personal name Zhao Bing) – Younger brother and successor of Emperor Duanzong; Seventh and Youngest son of Zhao Qi; Final emperor of the Song dynasty

Ancestry

See also
Chinese emperors family tree (middle)
List of emperors of the Song dynasty
Architecture of the Song dynasty
Culture of the Song dynasty
Economy of the Song dynasty
History of the Song dynasty
Society of the Song dynasty
Technology of the Song dynasty

References

 

1268 births
1278 deaths
Southern Song emperors
13th-century Chinese monarchs
Monarchs who died as children
Child monarchs from Asia
People from Hangzhou